Wiesława Martyka (born 2 June 1949) is a Polish luger. She competed in the women's singles event at the 1972 Winter Olympics.

References

1949 births
Living people
Polish female lugers
Olympic lugers of Poland
Lugers at the 1972 Winter Olympics
Sportspeople from Katowice